Stare Kiejkuty can refer to:
 Stare Kiejkuty, Warmian-Masurian Voivodeship, a village in northern Poland
 Stare Kiejkuty (base), a Polish military intelligence training base